The Curly-coated Retriever (not always hyphenated, and often called the Curly for short) is a breed of dog originally bred in England for upland bird and waterfowl hunting.  It is the tallest of the retrievers and is easily distinguishable by the mass of tight curls covering its body. Curly Coated and Wavy Coated (now known as the Flat-Coated Retriever) were the first two recognised retriever breeds, established as early as 1860.

Appearance
The Curly is an active, well-muscled dog bred for upland bird and waterfowl hunting. The Curly is somewhat different in structure than the more common retrievers. A Curly will appear slightly leggy but is actually slightly longer than tall. It is balanced and agile with a significant air of endurance, strength, and grace. Curlies are soft-mouthed and regularly handle game with care. In the show ring, taller is preferable to shorter. Weight should be in proportion to the height of the dog.

The breed sports a coat of tight, crisp curls. The tight curled coat of the Curly repels water, burrs, and prevents damage that other sporting dogs with softer, thinner coats cannot escape. The only acceptable colours for the Curly-Coated Retriever are solid black and solid liver. Occasional white hairs are permissible, but large white patches are a serious fault. Eyes should be either black or brown in black dogs, and brown or amber in liver dogs. Yellow eyes are unusual. The nose should be fully pigmented, and the same colour as the coat as the dog.

Temperament
The Curly-Coated Retriever was originally developed as a gamekeepers gun dog and their temperament and conformation reflect this purpose. Curlies are still used in many countries as bird hunting companions, including in both upland and waterfowl hunting. Like most retrievers, they are valued as pets and are a lively and fun-loving breed. As long as the Curly has enough exercise, it can be calm and laid back in the home environment, which makes them both a great activity dog as well as a placid member of the family.

The Curly can be sometimes aloof with strangers but are usually very loyal and affectionate with their owners and family. Curlies are extremely intelligent in general, but training can sometimes be difficult as they can easily get bored with repetitive training.

Care and maintenance

Coat
Curlies are a single coated breed with no undercoat, and the small tight curls of a show-standard dog are very easy to maintain. A Curly kept as a companion and/or hunting animal need not be elaborately groomed but needs to be kept clean and free of mats for the health of the dog. All Curlies shed though not to the degree that dogs with undercoats do. The Females of this dog breed usually shed more heavily during their heat cycles (usually twice a year). Dogs and bitches may also shed more in the spring, especially those living in areas with extreme seasonal temperature changes. Bathing should be as needed using a dog shampoo.

Show ring exhibitors normally trim feathering from the tail, ears, belly, legs, and feet. Trimming is not required when exhibiting a Curly at a conformation dog show, but most judges may discount the dog if it is not trimmed. Shaving of the body coat is undesirable. Colors only come in solid liver & black.

Exercise
The Curly-Coated Retriever likes exercise; it was bred for athleticism and endurance in the field.  A Curly is an intelligent dog and is happiest when it has adequate exercise, mental stimulation and play. Curlies are great dogs for active sports such as hunt tests, flyball and dog agility trials as they love the outdoors, working with people, and activities of any kind. While active and exuberant outside, at play, or in the field, the adult Curly is generally a calm house dog. According to the International Encyclopedia of Dogs (1984), "this dog's delight is swimming", which has made it a valuable retriever especially where streams and rivers have to be crossed.

Health

Life expectancy
Average life expectancy is 9–14 years, although there are instances of Curlies living to 15 to 17 years of age.

Known medical issues
Cancer
Cardiac problems
Epilepsy
Exercise-induced collapse
Eye problems such as cataracts, corneal dystrophy, distichiasis, entropion, ectropion, or retinal dysplasia
Gastric dilatation volvulus (bloat)
Glycogen storage disease (GSD)
Hip dysplasia

See also
 Dogs portal
 List of dog breeds
Chesapeake Bay Retriever
Labrador Retriever

References

 Stanley Dangerfield and Elsworth Howell, The International Encyclopedia of Dogs (1984 edition) Mermaid Books.

External links

FCI breeds
Dog breeds originating in England
Vulnerable Native Breeds
Gundogs
Retrievers